Liz Olson is an American politician serving in the Minnesota House of Representatives since 2017. A member of the Minnesota Democratic–Farmer–Labor Party (DFL), Olson represents District 8A in northeastern Minnesota, which includes parts of the city of Duluth in St. Louis County.

Early life, education, and career
Olson attended the University of Minnesota Duluth, graduating with a Bachelor of Arts in sociology and women's studies, and Luther Seminary, graduating with a Master of Arts in congregational and community care.

Olson is a community organizer who has worked for Churches United in Ministry, Generations Health Care Initiatives, and TakeAction Minnesota. She is a former president of the League of Women Voters of Duluth and is also a member of the advisory committee of the Minnesota Council of Nonprofits northeast chapter and a board member of Firefly Yoga International.

Minnesota House of Representatives
Olson was elected to the Minnesota House of Representatives in 2016 and has been reelected every two years since. Following the 2018 election, Olson became the majority whip for the Democratic-Farmer-Labor Party. She served as speaker pro tempore of the House from 2019 to 2022. During the 2021-22 legislative session, Olson served as a deputy majority leader.

Olson chairs the Ways and Means Committee and also sits on the Rules and Legislative Administration and Taxes Committees.

Electoral history

Personal life
Olson and her husband, Tom, have one child. They reside in the Denfeld neighborhood in Duluth.

References

External links

 Official House of Representatives website
 Official campaign website

1980s births
21st-century American politicians
21st-century American women politicians
Democratic Party members of the Minnesota House of Representatives
Living people
Luther Seminary alumni
Politicians from Duluth, Minnesota
University of Minnesota Duluth alumni
Women state legislators in Minnesota